Walscheid (Lorraine Franconian Wolscheid) is a commune in the Moselle department in Grand Est in north-eastern France.

Population

Notable people
 Clotilde Ngouabi (1940–2019), French-born First Lady of the Republic of the Congo (1969 - 1972)

See also
 Communes of the Moselle department

References

External links
 

Communes of Moselle (department)